Krasnoyarsky District is the name of several administrative and municipal districts in Russia:
Krasnoyarsky District, Astrakhan Oblast, an administrative and municipal district of Astrakhan Oblast
Krasnoyarsky District, Samara Oblast, an administrative and municipal district of Samara Oblast

See also
Krasnoyarsky (disambiguation)
Krasnoyarsk Krai, a federal subject of Russia

References